The 1991 Swiss Indoors was a men's tennis tournament played on indoor hard courts at the St. Jakobshalle in Basel, Switzerland that was part of the World Series of the 1991 ATP Tour. It was the 22nd edition of the tournament and took place from 23 September until 29 September 1991. Sixth-seeded Jakob Hlasek won the singles title.

Finals

Singles
 Jakob Hlasek defeated  John McEnroe 7–6(7–4), 6–0, 6–3
 It was Hlasek's 1st singles title of the year and the 5th, and last, of his career.

Doubles
 Jakob Hlasek /  Patrick McEnroe defeated  Petr Korda /  John McEnroe 3–6, 7–6, 7–6

References

External links
 ITF tournament edition profile

Swiss Indoors
Swiss Indoors
1991 in Swiss tennis